Chadraabalyn Lodoidamba (1917–1970) was a Mongolian writer.

He was born in Govi-Altai Province in 1917. In 1954 he graduated from National University of Mongolia, the same year that his first story "Malgaitai Chono" (The Wolf in the Cap) was published.

His novel The Crystal Clear Tamir River, set during Mongolia's 1921 revolution, was made into a movie trilogy (1970–1973) by Ravjagiin Dorjpalam. The book has also been translated into Russian and (from Russian) into German.

Works
Tungalag Tamir (The Crystal Clear Tamir River) (1962)
Manai surguuliinkhan (My School friends) (1952)
Altaid (In the Altai)

External links 
 Тунгалаг Тамир "Tungalag Tamir" from ELibrary.MN (Mongolian)

Chadrabalin Lodoidamba
1917 births
1970 deaths
National University of Mongolia alumni